Cholangiosarcoma is a tumor of the connective tissues of the bile ducts.

Primary risk factors for cholangiosarcoma are Primary Sclerosing Cholangitis and infection by Clonorchis Sinensis (a fluke found in undercooked fish).

References

 Cholangiosarcoma entry in the public domain NCI Dictionary of Cancer Terms

Sarcoma